Rawsthorne or Rawsthorn is a surname, and may refer to

 Alan Rawsthorne (1905–1971), English composer
 Alice Rawsthorn (b. 1958), English journalist
 John Rawsthorne (b. 1936), English Catholic bishop
 Isabel Rawsthorne (1912–1992), British painter
 Noel Rawsthorne (1929–2019), English organist and composer